U of B may refer to:

 University of Bridgeport, Bridgeport, Connecticut
 University of Baltimore, Maryland
 University of Barcelona, Catalonia, Spain
 University of Belgrano, Buenos Aires, Argentina
 University of Botswana
 University at Buffalo, The State University of New York

See also
 UB (disambiguation)